The 2008 UNAF U-20 Tournament was the 4th edition of the UNAF U-20 Tournament. The tournament took place in Morocco, from 5 to 14 June 2008. Egypt wins the tournament for the second time.

Participants

 (hosts)

Venue
Stade Père Jégo, Casablanca

Tournament

Matches

Champion

References

2008 in African football
UNAF U-20 Tournament
UNAF U-20 Tournament